Nothing to Hide is a theatrical magic show created and performed by Derek DelGaudio and Hélder Guimarães.

The show, written by DelGaudio, with magic choreography by Helder Guimarães and directed by Neil Patrick Harris, debuted at The Geffen Playhouse  in Los Angeles on November 27, 2012 and opened in New York City, off-Broadway, at The Romulus Linney Courtyard Theatre at the Pershing Square Signature Center on October 23, 2013.

References

Magic shows